The Accent 26, also called the Albin Accent and the Shipman Accent, is a Swedish sailboat that was designed by Peter Norlin as an International Offshore Rule Quarter Ton class cruiser-racer and first built in 1975.

Production
The design was built by both Albin Marine and Shipman Sweden AB in Sweden, from 1975 to 1980, with a total of 760 boats completed, but it is now out of production.

Design
The Accent 26 is a recreational keelboat, built predominantly of fibreglass, with wood trim. It has a masthead sloop rig with aluminum spars, a deck-stepped mast, wire standing rigging and a single set of unswept spreaders. The hull has a raked stem; a raised counter, reverse transom; a skeg-mounted rudder controlled by a tiller and a fixed fin keel. It displaces  and carries  of iron ballast.

The design has sleeping accommodation for six people, with a double "V"-berth in the bow cabin, an "L"-shaped settee and a straight settee in the main cabin and two aft quarter berths. There is a drop-leaf table in the main cabin. The galley is located on the starboard side just forward of the companionway ladder. The galley is equipped with a two-burner stove and a double sink. The enclosed head is located just aft of the bow cabin on the starboard side.

Operational history
The prototype won the 1974 World Quarter Ton class Championships.

See also
List of sailing boat types

References

External links

Accent 26 video

Keelboats
1970s sailboat type designs
Sailing yachts
Sailboat type designs by Peter Norlin
Sailboat types built by Albin Marine
Sailboat types built by Shipman Sweden AB